Veljko Paunović (born 21 August 1977) is a Serbian football manager and former player who is the current manager of Liga MX club Guadalajara.

A versatile attacking unit, he could operate as an attacking midfielder or a striker, and spent most of his professional career in Spain where he represented eight clubs, amassing La Liga totals of 212 matches and 38 goals over 11 seasons and having several spells with Atlético Madrid. Other than in his own country, he also played in Germany, Russia and the United States. 

Paunović began working as a manager in 2012, starting with Serbia's youth teams and later being in charge of Chicago Fire and Reading.

Playing career

Club
Born in Strumica, Socialist Republic of Macedonia, Socialist Federal Republic of Yugoslavia, Paunović made his professional debut at 17 with FK Partizan. The following summer he moved to Spain, where he would stay for most of the following decade playing for a host of clubs, starting in the 1995–96 season with modest CA Marbella and reaching the 1998–99 UEFA Cup Winners' Cup final with RCD Mallorca (with whom he scored five league goals in that campaign, to help the Balearic Islands team finish third), as well as having three separate stints with Atlético Madrid.

Paunović had his best year in 2002–03 with CD Tenerife in Segunda División, netting 18 times in 38 appearances although the insular side could only rank eighth. After a return to Atlético and a brief stay in Germany with Hannover 96, he joined Getafe CF for 2005–06's top flight, enjoying his finest season in La Liga by scoring ten goals in 30 league matches to help the Madrid outskirts club to the ninth place. Due to the years spent in the country, he received a Spanish passport in 2006.

Paunović was signed by Russian Premier League's FC Rubin Kazan in March 2007, after falling out of favour with Getafe coach Bernd Schuster. The following year, he agreed a two and a half-year deal with UD Almería in January. His debut was a sour one, playing 20 minutes off the bench against Racing de Santander in a 1–0 away defeat, while also receiving two yellow cards in one minute (with the consequent dismissal). He would score on two occasions towards the season's end, in a 4–2 away loss to former team Getafe and in the last matchday, a 3–1 victory at RCD Espanyol.

On 12 July 2008, Paunović signed a two-year deal with his former club Partizan. On 13 August, he scored in a 2–2 draw with Turkey's Fenerbahçe SK in the third qualifying round of the UEFA Champions League. Before the end of the year, however, he announced his decision to retire from the game.

On 29 June 2009, Paunović went on trial with the New York Red Bulls, but eventually turned down the one-year contract offer. In June 2011, after nearly three years out of football, the 33-year-old signed a deal with another North American club, Philadelphia Union, after a trial stint. He scored his first goal with his new team late in the month, in a 3–2 win over Chivas USA.

Paunović officially announced his retirement for the second time on 19 January 2012.

International
Paunović made his debut for Serbia and Montenegro in a 2–1 friendly win with Mexico, on 13 February 2002. His only other cap came two years later against Northern Ireland, another exhibition match, and he scored in the 1–1 draw in Belfast.

Coaching career

Serbia NT
Paunović earned a UEFA PRO coaching licence and a sporting director degree from the Royal Spanish Football Federation. For nine months, he was a UEFA Champions League analyst for RTVE in Spain.

Paunović began working as a manager with the Serbian national team, being of charge of their under-18, under-19 and under-20 sides. While with the latter, he won the 2015 FIFA World Cup.

Chicago Fire

On 24 November 2015, Paunović was appointed head coach of Chicago Fire FC in Major League Soccer. He led the team to the playoffs in 2017, which happened for the first time in five years. In the same year, he coached in the All-Star Game against Real Madrid.

Paunović also reached the semi-finals of the U.S. Open Cup in 2016 and 2018. He and the Fire parted ways on 13 November 2019.

Reading
Paunović replaced Mark Bowen as manager of Reading on 29 August 2020. On his EFL Championship debut on 12 September, the team won 2–0 at Derby County; he ended September as the division's Manager of the Month for winning all three games. They missed out on a playoff place with two games remaining, after a 2–2 draw against Swansea City at the Madejski Stadium.

In November 2021, during Paunović's second season, the team received a six-point deduction for breaching profitability and sustainability rules across the previous three seasons. The following January, the Royals were knocked out of the FA Cup in the third round by National League North side Kidderminster Harriers.

Following a 3–2 away victory over Preston North End on 19 February 2022, Reading announced that Paunović had left his role by mutual consent.

Guadalajara
On 31 October 2022, Paunović was named at Liga MX club C.D. Guadalajara.

Personal life
Paunović experienced hardships while training for football, such as walking for hours to practice and sometimes going without food. His father, Blagoje, was also a footballer. A defender who inspired him, he too played for Partizan and represented Yugoslavia at UEFA Euro 1968, later embarking in a managerial career.

Paunović is married and has four children. He is fluent in six languages: English, Spanish, Serbian, Macedonian, Russian and German.

Career statistics

Club

International goals
Scores and results list Serbia and Montenegro's goal tally first, score column indicates score after each Paunović goal.

Managerial statistics

Honours

Manager
Serbia
FIFA U-20 World Cup: 2015

Individual
EFL Championship Manager of the Month: September 2020

References

External links

1977 births
Living people
Sportspeople from Strumica
Serbian footballers
Serbia and Montenegro footballers
Association football midfielders
Association football forwards
First League of Serbia and Montenegro players
Serbian SuperLiga players
FK Partizan players
La Liga players
Segunda División players
CA Marbella footballers
Atlético Madrid B players
Atlético Madrid footballers
RCD Mallorca players
Real Oviedo players
CD Tenerife players
Getafe CF footballers
UD Almería players
Bundesliga players
Hannover 96 players
Russian Premier League players
FC Rubin Kazan players
Major League Soccer players
Philadelphia Union players
Serbia and Montenegro international footballers
Serbian expatriate footballers
Serbia and Montenegro expatriate footballers
Expatriate footballers in Spain
Expatriate footballers in Germany
Expatriate footballers in Russia
Expatriate soccer players in the United States
Serbian expatriate sportspeople in Spain
Serbian expatriate sportspeople in Germany
Serbian expatriate sportspeople in Russia
Serbian expatriate sportspeople in the United States
Serbia and Montenegro expatriate sportspeople in Spain
Serbia and Montenegro expatriate sportspeople in Germany
Serbian football managers
Major League Soccer coaches
Chicago Fire FC coaches
English Football League managers
Reading F.C. managers
Liga MX managers
C.D. Guadalajara managers
Serbia national under-20 football team managers
Serbian expatriate football managers
Expatriate soccer managers in the United States
Expatriate football managers in England
Expatriate football managers in Mexico
Serbian expatriate sportspeople in England
Serbian expatriate sportspeople in Mexico